Emily Irene VanCamp (born May 12, 1986) is a Canadian actress. She first came to prominence for her work with producer Greg Berlanti, who cast her as a series regular on The WB drama Everwood (2002–2006) and the ABC drama Brothers & Sisters (2007–2010). VanCamp gained further recognition by portraying the lead role of Emily Thorne on the ABC series Revenge from 2011 to 2015. From 2018 to 2021, VanCamp starred on the Fox medical drama series The Resident. She also plays Sharon Carter / Agent 13 / Power Broker in the Marvel Cinematic Universe (MCU), appearing in the films Captain America: The Winter Soldier (2014) and Captain America: Civil War (2016), as well as the 2021 Disney+ series The Falcon and the Winter Soldier and What If...?

Early life
VanCamp was born on May 12, 1986, in Port Perry, Ontario. Her father, Robert VanCamp, is an animal nutritionist, and her first job was working for him, delivering food to clients in and around her hometown. VanCamp started to dance at age three. At age 11, she wanted to become a professional dancer and convinced her parents to let her attend a summer training program in Montreal. When she was 12, she was accepted to the École supérieure de ballet du Québec, the training program of Les Grands Ballets Canadiens, and moved in with a French-Canadian family.

Career

1998–2002: Career beginnings
In 1998, VanCamp became interested in acting after visiting her sister Katie on the set of the film Ladies Room. She started taking acting classes on Saturday afternoons, found an agent, and after working on a few commercials, was cast in the second part of a special three-part episode of the Canadian children's horror anthology television series Are You Afraid of the Dark? called "The Silver Sight", in which she played opposite a 17-year-old Elisha Cuthbert. VanCamp's character was present in one scene and did not speak any dialogue.

VanCamp followed this with a role as a teenage Jackie Bouvier in the Emmy-nominated CBS TV movie Jackie Bouvier Kennedy Onassis and a guest spot on the YTV sitcom Radio Active. The following year saw the release of her first theatrical film, the lesbian-themed drama Lost and Delirious, in which she played a supporting role as Jessica Paré's sister, and another television guest spot in an episode of the short-lived medical horror series All Souls, where she played a hit-and-run victim with spinal trauma. VanCamp also had roles in the miniseries Dice, directed by Rachel Talalay, and in the TV film Redeemer, directed by Graeme Clifford, which aired in early 2002.

2003–2010: Breakthrough and television work
VanCamp's breakthrough came at age 15 when she was cast as Sam Dolan, a series regular role, in the WB mid-season show Glory Days (known in Europe as Demontown), the third TV series from Dawson's Creek creator Kevin Williamson. The horror mystery received mildly positive reviews, but was a ratings disappointment and was cancelled after nine episodes. VanCamp's performance as the lead character's younger sister caught the eye of former Dawson's Creek writer Greg Berlanti. Her performance reminded him of Katie Holmes, and he "desperately wanted to work with her". He cast her in his forthcoming first show, Everwood, also for the WB. VanCamp played Amy, Dr. Abbott's daughter, who immediately forms a friendship with Dr. Brown's son Ephram, played by Gregory Smith. A significant portion of the show was devoted to the relationships between the two families, and in particular to Amy and Ephram. She gained a certain amount of recognition for the role, in which her character was confronted with drugs, depression, and an alienation from her family, receiving four Teen Choice Awards nominations and one Young Artist Awards nomination during the course of the show's run.

While on breaks from Everwood, VanCamp starred in a few film projects, including the thrillers No Good Deed and A Different Loyalty, as well as Rings, a horror short film that bridges the events between The Ring and The Ring Two, and ties directly into her appearance in the opening scene of the latter film.

VanCamp filmed the post-apocalyptic horror film Carriers in the summer of 2006, which was not released until 2009. Early 2007 had the broadcast of a season-eight Law & Order: Special Victims Unit episode, in which her drug-addict character Charlotte Truex cannot recall her actions on the night her mother was murdered, and the premiere of the independent drama Black Irish, where her character Kathleen McKay, the sister of lead actor Michael Angarano's character Cole, has to deal with teenage pregnancy.

VanCamp's next big role came at age 20 when Everwood creator Greg Berlanti cast her as a regular midway into the first season of the ABC drama Brothers & Sisters, which he was showrunning, offering her the part directly. The Jon Robin Baitz–created series chronicles the lives of the Walkers, a wealthy family who owns a food company. After their patriarch dies, it is revealed he has a secret child from a long-standing affair, Rebecca Harper, played by VanCamp.

VanCamp remained a regular on Brothers & Sisters during the show's first four seasons and returned as a guest for a few episodes in the fifth and final season to wrap up her character's storyline. While working on the show, she found the time to star in the independent drama Norman in mid-2008, which earned her awards from the San Diego Film Festival and the Breckenridge Festival of Film, her only wins to date. The film has her playing the girlfriend of main character Norman Long, played by Dan Byrd, who pretends he is dying of cancer. VanCamp also starred in the two-part TV film Ben Hur, the latest adaptation of Lew Wallace's 1880 novel, in which she played Ben-Hur's wife Esther.

2011–present: Revenge and other projects
VanCamp starred in Hallmark Hall of Fame film Beyond the Blackboard, based on the true story of Stacey Bess, whom VanCamp plays. The film aired on CBS on April 24, 2011. She was then cast as Amanda Clarke / Emily Thorne in the ABC drama Revenge, which was given a series order in May 2011. As the first TV show VanCamp truly headlined, Revenge gave her a significant amount of recognition, including multiple Teen Choice Awards nominations.

VanCamp co-starred in the Marvel Cinematic Universe film Captain America: The Winter Soldier as Sharon Carter, a potential loyal friend of Chris Evans' titular hero and the great-niece of Peggy Carter, played by Hayley Atwell. The film was shot from April through June 2013 and was released on April 4, 2014. VanCamp reprised her role in the 2016 sequel Captain America: Civil War, the 2021 Disney+ series The Falcon and the Winter Soldier, and the animated series What If...?

VanCamp starred in the independent drama The Girl in the Book, which started filming in mid-June 2013 in New York City. Based on a true story, the film centers on VanCamp's character Alice, a 28-year-old assistant book editor and aspiring writer. To fund its post-production, the film's producers launched a crowdfunding Kickstarter campaign on June 17, 2013, which successfully surpassed its $65,000 goal on July 1.

In 2016, she starred in the French-Canadian independent drama Boundaries, also known as "Pays" in French, which was her first bilingual role where she spoke in fluent French.

In March 2017, VanCamp was cast as nurse practitioner Nic Nevin, the female lead in the Fox medical drama The Resident, whose character has a complicated romantic history and relationship with the main character Conrad Hawkins, played by Matt Czuchry. In May 2017, Fox ordered the pilot to series. In August 2021, VanCamp left The Resident after four seasons.

Personal life
VanCamp has three sisters. She speaks French fluently and "feels at home" when she hears the language. She is also an accomplished dancer who studied and trained in ballet, jazz, hip-hop, and tap as a child; she credits her dance training with helping her through her fight scenes on Revenge. She believes that if she had not gone into acting, she would have probably either continued dancing or done something related to cooking. VanCamp began dating English actor and Revenge co-star Josh Bowman in late 2011. On May 11, 2017, the couple announced they were engaged, and married on December 15, 2018, in the Bahamas. In 2021, VanCamp announced the birth of their first child, a daughter, on her Instagram account. VanCamp is also an equal pay supporter, and is involved in charitable efforts to help endangered tigers.

Filmography

Film

Television

Awards and nominations

References

External links

 
 

1986 births
Living people
20th-century Canadian actresses
21st-century Canadian actresses
Actresses from Ontario
Canadian ballerinas
Canadian child actresses
Canadian expatriate actresses in the United States
Canadian female dancers
Canadian film actresses
Canadian philanthropists
Canadian Screen Award winners
Canadian stage actresses
Canadian television actresses
People from Scugog